is a railway station on the Ban'etsu West Line in the town of Inawashiro, Fukushima Prefecture, Japan, operated by East Japan Railway Company (JR East).

Lines

Station layout
Okinashima Station has two opposed side platforms connected to the station building by a level crossing. The station is unattended.

Platforms

History
Okinashima Station opened on July 15, 1899. The station was absorbed into the JR East network upon the privatization of the Japanese National Railways (JNR) on April 1, 1987.

Surrounding area
 Okinashima onsen
 Tenkyōkaku 
 Noguchi Hideo Memorial Hall
 Noguchi Hideo-no-sato Post Office

See also
 List of railway stations in Japan

External links

 JR East Station information 

Railway stations in Fukushima Prefecture
Ban'etsu West Line
Railway stations in Japan opened in 1899
Inawashiro, Fukushima